Tata Advanced Systems Limited (TASL) is an Indian aerospace manufacturing, military engineering and defense technology company. It is a fully owned subsidiary of Tata Sons, a holding company for the Tata Group.

History
TASL entered into a joint-venture with Sikorsky Aircraft Corporation to manufacture the Sikorsky S-92 helicopter in India for the domestic civil and military markets. The plan was to have a US$200 million manufacturing plant operational in Hyderabad by 2010. As production began, the first S-92 cabin was delivered in November 2010, and capacity was expected to increase to 36–48 cabins a year. By the end of July 2013, assembly of 39 cabins had been completed.

The joint-venture with Sikorsky has since been expanded to include development of aerospace components for other OEMs. This facility, called Tara, also located in Hyderabad, was completed in 2011 and commenced production in 2012. Another TASL joint-venture, with Lockheed Martin, is producing aero structures for the Lockheed C-130 Hercules and the Lockheed C-130J Super Hercules in India. It is a 74:26 joint venture which currently assembles Hercules centre wing boxes and empennages.

In partnership with Airbus Defence and Space, the company fielded the EADS CASA C-295 for the Indian Air Force light-cargo fleet renewal program, which the Indian government approved on 13 May 2015. Under the project 16 complete aircraft will be imported, while 40 aircraft will be manufactured in India.

The company has also entered an agreement to produce structures for the Pilatus PC-12NG from 2016 to 2026.

On 3 May 2018, Tata Advanced Systems acquired Tata Motors' aerospace and defense unit in a sale.

In Sept 2018, Lockheed Martin announced that it is going to build all wings for the F-16 fighter jet in collaboration with TASL

In 2018, Tata Boeing Aerospace Limited (TBAL), a joint venture between Boeing [NYSE: BA] and Tata Advanced Systems Ltd. (TASL), inaugurated a facility in Hyderabad which will be the sole global producer of fuselages for AH-64 Apache helicopter delivered by Boeing to its global customers.

In 2020, Tata Advanced Systems acquired Tata Power SED from Tata Power.

In early 2021,  it was reported that Tata Advanced Systems of India had likely bought the intellectual property rights of the Grob G180 SPn aircraft for the development of a military variant to be offered to the Indian army as a signals intelligence gathering and surveillance platform. 

In February 2021, Lockheed Martin announced that they are teaming with Tata Advanced Systems for meeting the Indian Navy's proposed requirement for Naval Utility Helicopter (NUH).

In September 2021 India has signed deal of buying C-295 Cargo aircraft and that will be made by Tata Advanced System.

Major programs

License production of the C-295 in a JV with Airbus Defence and Space.
Design, development and production of TATA Kestrel for Indian Army. 
 Upgradation and modernization of 37 Airfields of Air Force Stations, Naval Stations and Coast Guard Civil Enclaves.  
Production and maintenance of Pinaka Multi Barrel Rocket launchers, command Posts and other support vehicles for Indian Army.
Production and Maintenance of Akash SAM launchers, command posts and other support vehicles for IAF.
Production and maintenance of MRSAM launchers, command posts and other support vehicles for IAF.
Production and maintenance of the control systems for Arihant-class submarine .
Production and development of Advanced Towed Artillery Gun System for Indian Army.
Design, development and production of Portable Diver Detection Sonar.
Production and Maintenance for PDV Mk-II launcher.

Products and services

Military vehicles

 Tata LSV (Light Specialist Vehicle)
 Tata Mine Protected Vehicle (4×4)
 Tata 2 Stretcher Ambulance
 Tata 407 Troop Carrier
 Tata LPTA 713 TC (4x4)
 Tata LPT 709 E
 Tata SD 1015 TC (4x4)
 Tata LPTA 1615 TC (4x4)
 Tata LPTA 1621 TC (6x6)
 Tata LPTA 1615 TC (4x2)
 Tata LPTA 5252 TC (12x12)
 Tata Sumo
 Tata Xenon
 Tata 207
 TATA Kestrel

UAVs
TASL is bidding to develop and build unmanned aerial vehicles (UAVs) for the Indian Armed Forces for surveillance. It has agreements with Israel Aerospace Industries (IAI) and "Urban Aeronautics" for cooperation and co-development of UAVs in India. It has developed and successfully flight tested long range kamikaze drone known as ALS-50 which can strike beyond ranges of 50 km and return back in case of abandoned mission and will soon be inducted into Indian armed forces.

Rajak 
TASL developed Rajak-XLR an enhanced variant of Rajak-ULR for Regiment of Artillery. It consists of a long-range continuous zoom-type thermal camera, long-range continuous zoom-type day camera and a laser rangefinder for analyzing the distance of target. The system can detect vehicles within a range of 50 km including the type and humans within 40 km.

References

External links
 Tata Advanced Systems home page

Tata Group
Defence companies of India
Aerospace companies of India
Manufacturing companies based in Hyderabad, India
Indian companies established in 2007
2007 establishments in Andhra Pradesh
Manufacturing companies established in 2004